In Swansea, Kingsway may refer to:
The Kingsway, a shopping street in the Swansea city centre
Kingsway, a thoroughfare in the Fforestfach Industrial Estate